Sherborne is a market town and civil parish in north west Dorset, in South West England. The parish includes the hamlets of Nether Coombe and Lower Clatcombe. The A30 road, which connects London to Penzance, runs through the town. In the 2011 census the population of Sherborne parish and the two electoral wards was 9,523. 28.7% of the population is aged 65 or older.

Sherborne's historic buildings include Sherborne Abbey, its manor house, independent schools, and two castles: the ruins of a 12th-century fortified palace and the 16th-century mansion known as Sherborne Castle built by Sir Walter Raleigh. Much of the old town, including the abbey and many medieval and Georgian buildings, is built from distinctive ochre-coloured ham stone.

The town is served by Sherborne railway station.

Toponymy
The town was named scir burne by the Saxon inhabitants, a name meaning "clear stream", after a brook that runs through the centre of the town, and is referred to as such in the Domesday Book.

History

In 705 the diocese of Wessex was split between Sherborne and Winchester, and King Ine founded an abbey for St Aldhelm, the first Bishop of Sherborne, which covered Dorset, Somerset, and Devon. King Alfred the Great's elder brothers, King Æthelbald and King Æthelberht, are buried in the abbey. The large Sherborne diocese lasted until about 909 when it was further sub-divided into three sees, with Sherborne covering Dorset. In 933, King Æthelstan granted land at Sherborne to the nuns of Shaftesbury Abbey under the condition that they would recite the Psalter once a year on All Saints' day and say prayers for the king. The bishop's seat was moved to Old Sarum in 1075 and the church at Sherborne became a Benedictine monastery. In 1437 the Abbey was damaged by fire after tensions between the town and the monastery came to a head, but much of the Norman structure stands today. Following the Dissolution of the Monasteries, in 1539, the vacated monastery buildings were bought by Sir John Horsey and became the parish church. Sherborne was the centre of a hundred of the same name for many centuries.

In the 12th century Roger de Caen, Bishop of Salisbury and Chancellor of England, built a fortified palace in Sherborne. During the English Civil War, the palace was destroyed in 1645 by General Fairfax. Its ruins are now owned by English Heritage.

In 1594 Sir Walter Raleigh built an Elizabethan mansion in the grounds of the old palace, today known as Sherborne Castle.

Sherborne became home to Yorkshireman Captain Christopher Levett, who came to the West Country as His Majesty's Woodward of Somersetshire, and who remained in Sherborne when he turned to a career as a naval captain and early explorer of New England.

Governance
In the UK national parliament, Sherborne is within the West Dorset parliamentary constituency.  , the Member of Parliament (MP) Chris Loder of the Conservative Party. In local government, Sherborne is administered by Dorset Council at the highest tier, and Sherborne Town Council at the lowest tier.

In national parliament and local council elections, Dorset is divided into several electoral wards, with Sherborne forming two of these: Sherborne West and Sherborne East. In county council elections, Dorset is divided into 42 electoral divisions, with Sherborne's two wards together forming Sherborne Electoral Division.

Education

There has been a school in Sherborne since the time of King Alfred, who was educated there. The school was re-founded in 1550 as King Edward's grammar school, using some of the old abbey buildings, though it is now known simply as Sherborne School. The school is one of the independent schools in Britain, with alumni such as Alan Turing, Jeremy Irons, Chris Martin, John le Carré, Hugh Bonneville and John Cowper Powys. Sherborne School operates Sherborne International, a school which seeks to integrate international students into the British public school tradition.

Sherborne School for Girls, often simply known as Sherborne Girls was founded in 1895. Its notable alumnae include the opera singer Emma Kirkby and the scientist Rosa Beddington.

Sherborne Preparatory School is located opposite Sherborne School, and many of its pupils choose to go on to Sherborne School or Sherborne Girls.

Until 1992 there were also two grammar schools, Foster's School for Boys and Lord Digby's School for Girls. Both schools merged with another local school to form The Gryphon School.

The town also has two primary schools, Sherborne Abbey Primary School and Sherborne Primary School.

Historic buildings
Notable historic buildings in the town include:

The almshouses of Saints John the Baptist and John the Evangelist: founded in 1437 and building completed in 1448. It was expanded in 1866 in indistinguishable medieval style architecture;

The conduit: originally built in the Abbey Cloister c.1520 as the Monks' wash place, but moved to the Market Place in 1560;

Hospice of St Julian: founded in c.1405;

No. 101 Newland: built 1297;

Lord Digby school, now known as Sherborne House (designed by Benjamin Bastard).  Sherborne House, famed for its mural by Sir James Thornhill, was a subject for the BBC's Restoration programme in 2004, and was sold in 2008 by Dorset County Council to a developer, Redcliffe Homes, for £3 million. Its renovation included rebuilding an unstable rear wall.

St Emerenciana's Chapel (now known as Nethercoombe Farm); built in the late 14th century. The only building in the country to have been dedicated to this saint.

There are 378 listed buildings within the town and 23 in Castleton (considered to be an inclusion of Sherborne), totalling 401, including 14 Grade I listed buildings and 21 Grade II* listed buildings.

Churches

The parish church, known as Sherborne Abbey is the most prominent building in the town.

There is a Catholic Church, Church of St Aldhelm and the Sacred Heart, on Westbury.

Cheap Street Church is a joint Methodist and United Reformed congregation.

Demographics

Notable residents

 Mike Davis, a rugby player and coach with England.
 The social reformer and moralist Rev Sir James Marchant died here in 1956.
 Olympic sailor Andrew Simpson (1976–2013) lived here.
 Olympic field hockey player Michael Walford lived and worked here for many years before his death in 2002.

Environment and community

Sherborne has an active green community, with various environmental and sustainability organisations in the area. The Quarr Local Nature Reserve at the northern end of the town makes use of an old quarry and landfill site, Sherborne Area Partnership oversees a successful environment forum and, in 2009, Sherborne became an official Transition Town, running a number of projects and events as a community response to climate change and peak oil.

Pack Monday Fair
The town has for centuries hosted an annual street fair, Pack Monday Fair, starting on the Monday following 10 October (Old Michaelmas Day). Originally an agricultural fair, it is now devoted to stalls, sideshows and a funfair.

Sport and leisure
Sherborne has a non-League football club Sherborne Town FC, a cricket club (Sherborne CC), and a rugby club, Sherborne RFC.

International relations

Sherborne is a founding member of the Douzelage, a town twinning association of 24 towns across the European Union. This active town twinning began in 1991 and there are regular events, such as a produce market from each of the other countries and festivals.
Discussions regarding membership are also in hand with three further towns (Agros in Cyprus, Škofja Loka in Slovenia, and Tryavna in Bulgaria).

Sherbourne Street, Toronto and Sherbourne (TTC) subway station was named after the town, as it was the birthplace of Upper Canada official and Toronto resident Thomas Ridout.

See also
 Sherborne Hundred for more on the history of the hundred

Sources and references

General sources
 Pitt-Rivers, Michael, 1968.  Dorset.  London: Faber & Faber.
 The 1985 AA illustrated guide to the towns and villages of Britain.

Citations

External links

 Town web site
 

 
Market towns in Dorset
Towns in Dorset